Lusty Glaze (meaning "a place to view blue boats") also known as Lusty Glaze Beach,  is a beach in Newquay, Cornwall.

Lusty Glaze is privately owned, notably to the low watermark. For much of the year, the beach is open, free of charge to the public.  The only access to the beach is via 133 steps. 

For many years the current owner operated the UK's first dedicated Rescue Training Centre and Outdoor Activity Centre. Today, Lusty Glaze hosts a wide variety of weddings and events, offers accommodation in the original beach cottage, constructed in 1921 and a range of beach cabins or pods. The cove is naturally sheltered by high cliffs.   

The current owner, Tracey Griffiths, purchased the site in 1999.

Lusty Glaze is home to a thriving Surf Lifesaving club.

Etymology
The name "Lusty Glaze" is derived from the Cornish for "a place to view blue boats".

References

External links

Tourist attractions in Cornwall
Beaches of Cornwall
Surfing locations in Cornwall